Bardi may refer to:

Australian uses
Bardi language, the language of the Bardi people
 Bardi people, an Indigenous Australian people, inhabiting parts of the Kimberley region of Western Australia  
Ardyaloon, Western Australia, also called One Arm Point or Bardi, a small community in Australia
 Bardi bush, an Australian plant, Acacia victoriae
 Bardi grub, an Australian moth, Trictena atripalpis

People
Barði Jóhannsson (born 1975), Icelandic singer
Mario Bardi (1922–1998), painter
Francesco Bardi (born 1992), footballer
Vito Bardi (born 1951),  Italian general and politician
Cardi B (born 1992), American rapper also known as Bardi
Bardi family, influential Florentine family from the 12th to 15th centuries
Giovanni de' Bardi (1534–1612), literary critic, writer, composer, and soldier

Places

Bardi, Emilia-Romagna, a city in the province of Parma, northern Italy
Bardi, Iran, a village in Ilam Province, Iran

See also
Bardy (disambiguation)

Language and nationality disambiguation pages